Managers of Virtue: Public School Leadership in America, 1820–1980 is a history book by David Tyack and Elisabeth Hansot. Its first two sections discuss American educational leadership in the common school and Progressive eras, and its last part discusses the subsequent decline in school leader authority and public confidence.

References

External links 

 

1982 non-fiction books
History books about education
Educational administration
Basic Books books
English-language books
American history books